Catatinagma trivittellum is a moth of the family Gelechiidae. It is found in France, Hungary, North Macedonia, Greece and Russia. It was recently recorded from Bulgaria.

The wingspan is about 9 mm for males and 6.5 mm for females. The ground colour of the forewings is dull white and the hindwings are bright grey.

References

Moths described in 1903
Apatetrini
Moths of Europe